Pure is a dating platform that allows users to post personal ads to find matches based on their desires, preferences, and intentions.

History 
Ukrainians Roman Sidorenko and Alexander Kukhtenko first presented Pure in 2012 and raised $400,000 in investments. Later, the writer and sexologist Carol Queen backed up the project.

The app was launched in the USA on the App Store in October 2013 and was later introduced to the Russian market in January 2014.

In 2015, Pure was ranked third in the Lisbon Challenge and was granted an office in Lisbon for 30 years by the Mayor's Office of the City of Lisbon, where they continue to be based.

Olga Petrunina became the CEO of Pure in 2020.

Operation 
The average user of Pure is between 25 and 40 years old, with 67 percent identifying as male, 30 percent female, and 3 percent non-binary.

Mobile application 
The first Android version of Pure was released in June 2015.

The app has generated over 8.5 million downloads on the App Store and over 3 million downloads on Google Play from June 2015.

Pure Journal and Social Media 
Pure creates written and, visual content together with sex educators and psychologists in 40 languages covering subjects such as dating, pleasure, wellness, culture, and consent. That content is found in the app's Pure Journal and on the app's Instagram profile.

Criticism 
The co-founder of the Teamo app (a service for serious dating) Vladimir Schmidt said that he did not see the potential of the application: "Such a model should be in great demand among men, but for girls it is still an unusual format. If the gap between the percentage of male and female audiences continues to grow, so-called love professionals - call girls - may come to the app and use the service to find new clients".

Reception 
In November 2021 the app had a half-million active users. In the New York City area, it has 20,000 daters.

Features 
When creating a profile, users are able to find matches based on their gender identity (male, female, and non-binary) and sexual preference (heterosexual, queer, lesbian, bisexual, and asexual).

Pure includes a 24-hour countdown once two users match. If the daters don't talk during that window, the chat "self-destructs" unless both parties agree to turn off the chat timer. After disabling the chat timer, both parties are assigned a random, anonymous nickname. Everyone on Pure can remain anonymous.

Pure has the option to switch to a video chat. While the platform's in-house camera allows for video chats for users to chat or sext, those videos are never saved - neither on Pure's servers nor in the cloud.

Users can either search a city of their choice or search for people within a certain distance from their current location. A "worldwide" option is also available.

See also 
 Dating
 Tinder
 Mamba
 Hookup culture
 Hinge
 Bumble

External links 

 Pure sex app targets 'open-minded' Britain
 'Pure,' Sex App, Divides Itself From 'Time Consuming' Tinder With Single-Minded Focus
 No-Frill Thrills: The Rise of Minimalist Sex Apps

References 

Mobile social software
Online dating services of Russia